Leftover Wine is an imaginary concept. 

it is also a live album released by Melanie in 1970 on the Buddah label. Production and arrangements were conducted by her then-husband, Peter Schekeryk. The album was recorded at Carnegie Hall in New York City, except for the closing track "Peace Will Come", which was a studio recording that was released as a single to promote the album.

Background
The concert at Carnegie Hall was the first of Melanie's two appearances in 1970. While Melanie's studio albums typically feature complex arrangements, for the concert Melanie was only accompanied by her acoustic guitar. Melanie's performance displays her most diverse and emotionally compelling vocals. In several instances, she redirects the songs directly to her audience and was actively communicating with them to keep them engaged. The performance featured songs from her previous album, Candles in the Rain and other associated standards like "Momma Momma" and "Happy Birthday". The crowd was ecstatic and as Margie English wrote "She drew strength from them and sang on until she had no more songs. When she rose to leave some of them embraced her, and tears were exchanged". The album is also known as Live: Recorded at Margie's Birthday Party.

The live album was released in September 1970. "Peace Will Come (According to Plan)" was released as a single earlier in the month. It charted at #32 nationally and the album had similar success when it charted at #33. On February 7, 2007 Leftover Wine was re-released in a double compact disc including her other 1970 album, Candles in the Rain. It was distributed by Edsel Records, and included one bonus track for the live album called "Stop! I Don't Want to Hear it Anymore".

Track listing
All songs were written by Melanie Safka.

"Close to It All" – 3:25
"Uptown Down" – 2:53
"Momma Momma" – 4:30
"The Saddest Thing" – 3:46
"Beautiful People" – 4:17
"Animal Crackers" – 2:30
"I Don't Eat Animals" – 2:10
"Happy Birthday" – 0:52
"Tuning My Guitar" – 4:00
"Psychotherapy" – 4:55
"Leftover Wine" – 4:42
"Peace Will Come (According to Plan)" – 4:47

Personnel
Melanie - guitar, vocals
Al Gorgoni, Sal DiTroia - guitar
Joe Macho - bass
Ron Frangipane - keyboards
Gregg Diamond - drums
George Devens - percussion
Artie Kaplan - woodwind

Charts

References

Melanie (singer) albums
1970 live albums
Buddah Records live albums
Albums recorded at Carnegie Hall